Eden Victoria Lena Robinson (born 19 January 1968) is an Indigenous Canadian author. She is a member of the Haisla and Heiltsuk First Nations.

Life

Childhood
Born in Kitamaat, British Columbia, she is a member of the Haisla and Heiltsuk First Nations. Her sister, Carla Robinson, is a television journalist for CBC Newsworld.

Education
She received a BA from the University of Victoria and an MFA from the University of British Columbia.

Later life 
In 2003, Robinson moved back to Kitamaat Village to care for her father who had been diagnosed with Parkinson's Disease in 1998. In 2019, Robinson was diagnosed with polymyalgia rheumatica.

Literary works

Robinson's first book, Traplines (1995), was a collection of four short stories. The young narrators recount haunting tales of their disturbing relationships with sociopaths and psychopaths. The collection won Britain's Winifred Holtby Memorial Prize for the best regional work by a Commonwealth writer. One of the stories, "Queen of the North", was also published in The Penguin Anthology of Stories by Canadian Women. Another of her short stories, "Terminal Avenue", (which was not included in Traplines) was published in the anthology of postcolonial science fiction and fantasy So Long Been Dreaming.

Her second book, Monkey Beach (2000), is a novel. It is set in Kitamaat territory and follows a teenage girl's search for answers to and understanding of her younger brother's disappearance at sea while in the retrospective, it tells a story about growing up on a Haisla reserve. The book is both a mystery and a spiritual journey, combining contemporary realism with Haisla mysticism. Monkey Beach was shortlisted for the Scotiabank Giller Prize and the Governor General's Literary Award, and received the Ethel Wilson Fiction Prize.

In her third book, Blood Sports (2006), also a novel, Robinson returns to the characters and urban terrain of her novella "Contact Sports," from Traplines.

Her novel Son of a Trickster (2017) is a humorous coming of age novel and the first of a trilogy. It took Robinson eight years to write, and was originally conceived as a short story. The second book in the trilogy is Trickster Drift (2018), which follows the main character from Kitamaat to Vancouver. The third book in the trilogy, titled The Return of the Trickster, was published March 2, 2021.

Son of a Trickster was optioned for a television series, which premiered as Trickster on CBC Television in 2020.

Awards and honours
Robinson was awarded the Ethel Wilson Fiction Prize in 2001 for Monkey Beach, and the Writers' Trust Engel/Findley Award in 2016 for her body of work. In 2017 she was named a recipient of the $50,000 Writers' Trust Fellowship.

Son of a Trickster was shortlisted for the 2017 Scotiabank Giller Prize. Trickster Drift won the Ethel Wilson Fiction Prize at the BC Book Awards on May 11, 2019.

Son of a Trickster was selected for the 2020 edition of Canada Reads, in which it was defended by actress Kaniehtiio Horn.

Bibliography
Traplines (1996), 
Monkey Beach (2000), 
Blood Sports (2006), 
Sasquatch at Home: Traditional Protocols & Modern Storytelling (2011), 
Son of a Trickster (2017), 
Trickster Drift (2018), 
Return of the Trickster (2021),

References

External links 
Records of Eden Robinson are held by Simon Fraser University's Special Collections and Rare Books

1968 births
Living people
21st-century Canadian novelists
First Nations women writers
Canadian women novelists
Magic realism writers
Haisla people
Heiltsuk people
Writers from British Columbia
People from Kitimat
Academic staff of the University of New Brunswick
University of Victoria alumni
University of British Columbia alumni
Canadian women short story writers
21st-century Canadian women writers
First Nations novelists
20th-century Canadian short story writers
20th-century Canadian women writers
21st-century Canadian short story writers
20th-century First Nations writers
21st-century First Nations writers